Asansör (Turkish for "elevator", derived from the French word ascenseur) is a historical building in İzmir's Karataş quarter, within the boundaries of the metropolitan district of Konak. It was built in 1907 as a work of public service by a wealthy Jewish banker and trader of that period, Nesim Levi Bayraklıoğlu, in order to ease passage from the narrow coastline of Karataş to the hillside, the elevator within the building serving to carry people and goods through the steep cliff between the two parts of the quarter. 

In time, the small street that led to the building also came to be known under the same name, Asansör Street (Asansör Sokağı). In the 1940s, one of the residents of the street was the singer Darío Moreno, who was to attain fame later. 

It was recently restored and since then, became one of the landmarks of İzmir. The street was renamed Darío Moreno Street in memory of the singer.

References
 Özkan, Timur. Asansör, İzmir. Fotogezgin.com, 2008.

External links

Tourist attractions in İzmir
Buildings and structures in İzmir
Individual elevators
Buildings and structures completed in 1907
Jews and Judaism in İzmir